The What We Do in the Shadows franchise consists of New Zealand and American mockumentary horror-comedy installments including one limited-theatrical film, a number of short films, two spin-off television series, and one digital series. Created by Jemaine Clement and Taika Waititi, the plot concerns several vampires who live together in shared accommodation, who are followed by a documentary film crew.

Films

What We Do in the Shadows (2014)

Vampire housemates (Jemaine Clement, Taika Waititi, Jonathan Brugh) cope with the complexities of modern life and introduce a newly turned vampire to the benefits of being undead.

We're Wolves (TBA)

A sequel to the What We Do in the Shadows, focused on the werewolves depicted in the film, originally rumoured to be titled What We Do in the Moonlight, was announced as being in development in August 2015. In May 2019 Taika Waititi said "We're Wolves is the film that Jemaine and I keep pretending that we’re making. Every couple of years we say, we’re making this new film called We're Wolves which follows the werewolves from the film,” said Waititi. “I feel bad to even mention it now because we keep saying it, [but] it’s like a dad saying, ‘Yeah, I’ll be home for Christmas.’ I suppose we’re just two dads out on the road enjoying our lives and going, ‘We’re not coming home for Christmas.’ We'll send a postcard. It's not like we don't want to come home for Christmas. We would like nothing more but we have a lot of shit going on. When are you going to die? Do you have a ... deadline before your death? I guarantee it before then. Five years, 10 years? It took us seven years to write the [first] film, so you do the math. That was a sad thing to say."

Short films

What We Do in the Shadows: Interviews with Some Vampires (2005)
The original 29-minute short film by Taika Waititi & Jemaine Clement, which inspired their 2014 film. In the short, three vampires—Deacon Brugh (Jonny Brugh), Count Viago (Waititi), and Vulvus the Abhorrent (Clement)—who share an apartment are interviewed by a TV crew.

Dating 101 with Viago (2014)

A short film and advertisement campaign to promote the online dating services FindSomeone and Dating for Shoes. The film follows Dating for Shoes founder Angela Meyer giving Viago a tutorial on creating his very own FindSomeone profile: from creating a username, to describing his hobbies and interests.

Vampire's Guide to Vellington (2014)

A short film and advertisement campaign by Wellington, as a comedic promotion that the city is a vampire-friendly place to visit. The film follows vampire Viago promoting the nightlife, cinemas and clothes shops of the city alongside his flatmates Vladislav and Deacon. As part of the campaign, the 'W' in the Wellington Blown Away sign on Miramar hill was temporarily changed to a blood-red 'V'.

Television

Wellington Paranormal (2018–2022)

The series follows Officers Minogue and O'Leary, who originally appeared as secondary characters in the 2014 film. They join a paranormal division of the Wellington Police Department under Sergeant Maaka (Maaka Pohatu). The show debuted on TVNZ 2 in 2018, and was renewed several times. The fourth and final season aired in 2022.

What We Do in the Shadows (2019–present)

The series follows four vampire roommates and one vampire familiar living on Staten Island.

In May 2020, the series was ordered for a third season, while season two was still airing.
Production for season three was set to start in February 2021, before being postponed to later in 2021 due to the COVID-19 pandemic.

Digital series

Important COVID-19 Messages from Wellington Paranormal is a sixteen-episode digital web series and public service campaign released in 2020 by New Zealand Police to inform the public on health, safety, and best practices during the COVID-19 pandemic. The series follows Officers Minogue and O'Leary in home isolation, and features several guests including Sergeant Maaka and Officer Parker. The series also includes Andrew Coster and Clarke Gayford as themselves.

Main cast and characters

Additional crew and production details

Reception

Box office and financial performance

Critical and public response

References

2010s comedy horror films
English-language films
Features based on short films
Films directed by Taika Waititi
Films set in New Zealand
Films shot in New Zealand
American mockumentary films
2010s parody films
Vampire comedy films
Vampire film series
Wellington in fiction
Werewolf films
Television franchises
New Zealand comedy horror films
Mass media franchises introduced in 2014
Film series introduced in 2014